This is a list of launches made by the Proton rocket between 1990 and 1999. All launches were conducted from the Baikonur Cosmodrome.

Launches

| colspan="6" |

1990

|-

| colspan="6" |

1991

|-

| colspan="6" |

1992

|-

| colspan="6" |

1993

|-

| colspan="6" |

1994

|-

| colspan="6" |

1995

|-

| colspan="6" |

1996

|-

| colspan="6" |

1997

|-

| colspan="6" |

1998

|-

| colspan="6" |

1999

|-

|}

References

Universal Rocket (rocket family)
Proton1990
Proton launches